Tefaro is a Papuan language of the Indonesian province of Papua, on the eastern shore of Cenderawasih Bay. It is spoken in Demba and Tefaro villages of Waropen Regency.

Tefaro is lexically similar to the East Geelvink Bay languages and presumably belongs in that family, but is too poorly attested to be sure.

References

Languages of western New Guinea
East Geelvink Bay languages
Endangered languages